Panhuo Road station, formerly known as Huancheng South Road station during construction, is an underground subway station in Ningbo, Zhejiang, served by Line 4 of Ningbo Rail Transit. Construction of the station began as planned in 2015.

Style 
Panhuo Road Station is located in the crossing between Huancheng South Road and Ningbo-Hengxi Road, Yinzhou District. The station is an underground 2-story island platform station with following characteristics: a length of 192m and a width of 19.7m. The total construction area is 11131 sq meters.

Exits 
It has been set four exits.

References 

P
Railway stations in China opened in 2020